Egidio Premiani (16 February 1909 – 18 May 2002) was an Italian basketball player who competed in the 1936 Summer Olympics. He was born in Trieste. Premiani was part of the Italian basketball team, which finished seventh in the Olympic tournament. He played all five matches.

References

External links
 
part 7 the basketball tournament

1909 births
2002 deaths
Italian men's basketball players
Olympic basketball players of Italy
Basketball players at the 1936 Summer Olympics